Andreas M. Schmidt (23 November 1963 – 28 September 2017) was a German screen actor and theatre director. During his thirty-year career, he appeared in over 130 film and television productions.

Biography
Born in Heggen, Finnentrop, Schmidt grew up in the Märkisches Viertel in West Berlin. He was a singer and guitarist in the rock band Lillies große Liebe in the 1980s. His first acting role was in the 1987 film . Schmidt received three nominations at the Deutscher Filmpreis, winning once in 2009. Notable film appearances by Schmidt include Sommer vorm Balkon (2005), The Counterfeiters (2007), The Moon and Other Lovers (2008) and Henri 4 (2010). He also had roles in television programs such as Tatort, Der Kriminalist and Polizeiruf 110. In addition, he directed theatre.

Schmidt lived in Kreuzberg, Berlin with his family. He died of cancer on 28 September 2017, at the age of 53. He was survived by his American wife, Jennifer, and their son (born 2008).

Selected filmography

 (1987) - Möhre (uncredited)
 (1988) - Humphrey
Stille Betrüger (1989) - Georg
The Rose Garden (1989) - Vladimir
Der doppelte Nötzli (1990)
Life Is All You Get (1997) .... Mieter mit Schrank
Plus-minus null (1998) .... Alex
Kai Rabe gegen die Vatikankiller (1998) .... F / X Mann
Gangster (1999) .... Erbse
Crazy (2000) .... Ricardo
Conamara (2000) .... Axel
Planet Alex (2001) .... Harald
Heidi M. (2001) .... Erich
Viktor Vogel – Commercial Man (2001) .... Alfi
99euro-films (2001) .... (segment "Ein Mann boxt sich durch")
Julies Geist (2001) .... Hans
Pigs Will Fly (2002) .... Laxe
Auszeit (2002) .... Donald
Eierdiebe (2003) .... Polizeibeamter Zwei
Alltag (2003) .... Waffenschieber
Yugotrip (2004) .... Pförtner 2
Farland (2004) .... Imbissbesitzer Hans
 (2004) .... Winnie Marzewski
Guys and Balls (2004) .... Jürgen
Folge der Feder! (2004) .... Police Officer 1
Summer in Berlin (2005) .... Ronald
 (2005) .... Toni Neer
Neandertal (2006) .... Rudi
Gefangene (2006) .... Vasile
The Counterfeiters (2007) .... Zilinski
Rudy: The Return of the Racing Pig (2007) .... Spacko
 (2008) .... Gurki
The Moon and Other Lovers (2008) .... Siggi
Henri 4 (2010) .... Guillaume du Bartas
Eines Tages... (2010) .... Stefan Ranft
Tage die bleiben (2011) .... Iggy
 (2011) .... Andi Komorowski
Faust (2011) .... Valentin's Friend
 (2012) .... Sklaventreiber Bill
 (2012) .... Schoen
Wetlands (2013) .... Freund der Eltern
 (2013) .... Uwe
Sputnik (2013) .... Herr Karl
Auf das Leben! (2014) .... Prof. Werner
Ente gut! (2016) .... Frank Weiss
 (2017) .... Belial
The Invisibles (2017) .... Hans Winkler (final film role)

References

External links

 

1963 births
2017 deaths
Deaths from cancer in Germany
German male film actors
German male television actors
German theatre directors
Male actors from Berlin
People from Olpe (district)
People from Reinickendorf